Antonia Lanthaler (born 3 April 1946) is an Austrian luger. She competed in the women's singles event at the 1964 Winter Olympics.

References

1946 births
Living people
Austrian female lugers
Olympic lugers of Austria
Lugers at the 1964 Winter Olympics